Propleopus chillagoensis is an extinct species of marsupial, of the genus Propleopus. It was found in new North Queensland, and is related to the musky rat-kangaroo. Propleopus chillagoensis was likely omnivorous.

References

Prehistoric macropods
Prehistoric mammals of Australia
Pleistocene marsupials
Fossil taxa described in 1978